Motherland is the third solo album by Natalie Merchant, released in 2001.  It was her last studio album released on Elektra Records.

The album is musically eclectic, varying from Middle Eastern violin–reggae beat fusion "This House Is on Fire" to 10,000 Maniacs-sounding "Tell Yourself". Folky "Motherland" precedes stylistically Merchant's next album, The House Carpenter's Daughter.

Originally, "The End" was supposed to appear on the album instead of "Not In This Life." Merchant noted that:

I'd take out one song, 'Not in This Life,'  she said, referring to a midtempo meditation on love, because it seems frivolous to me now. And I'd put back a song called 'The End,' which probably would have gotten me in trouble. Part of the lyric goes: 'That'll be the end of war/ the end of the law of Bible, of Koran, Torah.' I really wanted to put it on the record, but I felt there was so much serious material already that I chose something lighter, for balance.
The album is dedicated to the victims of September 11, 2001 terrorist attacks upon the United States. However, the recording was finished two days before the event, so the songs are not influenced by it. The event has still affected people's interpretations of the lyrics. Additionally, the cover was changed at the last minute to accommodate the post-9/11 world.
Her original concept for the photograph on the album cover was a picture of children in a field wearing oxygen masks: We shot these kids in upstate New York on Sept 10. And then we were going to reshoot on the 11th. Of course we canceled the session. The day I brought the pictures into the city, there were articles on the run here for Cipro and gas masks. I was getting pressure, anyway, from the record label, friends even, that the image was too controversial. So finally I gave in.
A photograph of a demure-looking Ms. Merchant was used instead.

The title song was later covered by Joan Baez and Christy Moore.

Track listing 
All songs written by Natalie Merchant.
 "This House Is on Fire" – 4:42
 "Motherland" – 4:44
 "Saint Judas" – 5:44
 "Put the Law on You" – 5:01
 "Build a Levee" – 4:46
 "Golden Boy" – 4:10
 "Henry Darger" – 4:24
 "The Worst Thing" – 5:46
 "Tell Yourself" – 5:14
 "Just Can't Last" – 4:31
 "Not in This Life" – 5:22
 "I'm Not Gonna Beg" – 3:40

Personnel 

 Natalie Merchant – vocals, Rhodes piano (5), acoustic piano (11, 12)
 Elizabeth Steen – Hammond organ (1, 3, 4, 5, 9-12), mellotron (6), Wurlitzer electric piano (8), acoustic piano (9)
 Van Dyke Parks – accordion (2)
 Patrick Warren – pump organ (2, 9), Chamberlin (5, 6, 9, 10, 11)
 Keefus Ciancia – acoustic piano (4), Hammond organ (5), keyboards (6)
 Guy Klucevsek – accordion (8)
 Gabriel Gordon – electric guitar (1, 3, 4, 6, 8, 10, 11, 12), EBow (6), classical guitar (8), acoustic guitar (10, 11), vocals (10)
 Erik Della Penna – oud (1), banjo (3, 10), electric guitar (4, 6, 8, 11), classical guitar (8), acoustic guitar (9), bouzouki (10), lap steel guitar (10, 12)
 Greg Leisz – acoustic guitar (2, 9), banjo (2), mandolin (2), electric guitar (5), 12-string guitar (9)
 Graham Maby – bass guitar (1, 3, 4, 8-12)
 Mike Elizondo – acoustic bass (2, 6)
 Bob Glaub – bass guitar (5)
 Matt Chamberlain – drums (1, 3-6, 8, 9-12), percussion (1, 6, 8, 9, 11)
 Carla Azar – drums (live) (6)
 Sandra Church – alto flute (1)
 David Ralicke – tenor saxophone (4, 5, 10), baritone saxophone (5, 10), trombone (10)
 Mitchell Estrin – bass clarinet (7)
 David Krakauer – clarinet (8)
 Tony Kadleck – trumpet (7)
 Chris Tedesco – trumpet (10)
 Philip Myers – French horn (7)
 Stephen Barber – arrangements and conductor (1, 7, 8)
 Mavis Staples – vocals (3, 5)
 Kate Daley – Vivian girl's (7)
 Kelly Daley – Vivian girl's (7)
 Katie Goldberg – vocals (9)
String sections (1, 7, 8)
 Alan Stepansky – cello (1, 7, 8)
 Elizabeth Dyson – cello (7)
 Sarah Seiver – cello (7)
 Jeremy McCoy – double bass (7)
 Karen Dreyfus – viola (1, 7, 8)
 Nicholas Cords – viola (7)
 Vivek Kamath – viola (7)
 Sandra Park – violin (1, 8), first violin (7), string contractor (7)
 Sharon Yamada – violin (1, 7, 8)
 Bruno Eicher – violin (7)
 Soo Hyun Kwon – violin (7)
 Ann Kim – violin (7)
 Lisa Kim – violin (7)
 Krzysztof Kuznik – violin (7)
 Karen Marx – violin (7)
 Laura Seaton – violin (7)
 Rob Shaw – violin (7)
 Fiona Simon – violin (7)
 Jung Sun Yoo – violin (7)

Production 
 T-Bone Burnett – producer 
 Natalie Merchant – producer, package design 
 Mike Piersante – recording 
 Ryan Boesch – recording assistant 
 Kevin Dean – recording assistant 
 Brandon Mason – recording assistant 
 Keith Shortreed – recording assistant 
 Jim Scott – additional recording, mixing 
 Jennifer Hilliard – mix assistant 
 Robert Read – mix assistant 
 Bob Ludwig – mastering at Gateway Mastering (Portland, Maine)
 Paul Ackling – production assistant, guitar technician 
 Lili Picou – package design 
 Laura Wilson – photography 
 Gary Smith – management

Charts

References

External links 
 Motherland Lyrics

2001 albums
Albums produced by T Bone Burnett
Elektra Records albums
Natalie Merchant albums